Suzanne Vos was a South African politician. She was a member of the Inkatha Freedom Party and Parliament.

Vos was also a member of the Pan-African Parliament and rapporteur of the Committee on Transport, Industry, Communications, Energy, Science and Technology, one of its Permanent Committees. Vos is currently sitting on the board of the South African Broadcasting Commission (SABC).

References

Year of birth missing (living people)
Living people
Members of the Pan-African Parliament from South Africa
Inkatha Freedom Party politicians
Members of the National Assembly of South Africa
21st-century South African women politicians
21st-century South African politicians
Women members of the Pan-African Parliament
Women members of the National Assembly of South Africa